Open Quaternary is a peer-reviewed open access scientific journal publishing contributions that consider the changing environment of the Quaternary as well as the development of humanity. It published with Ubiquity Press. It has four editors in chief: Victoria Herridge, Matthew Law, Hanneke Meijer, and Suzanne Pilaar Birch.

Abstracting and indexing 
The journal is abstracted and indexed in:

References

External links 
 

Open access journals
Quaternary science journals
Publications established in 2015
English-language journals
Ubiquity Press academic journals